Dioxin may refer to:

1,2-Dioxin or 1,4-Dioxin, two unsaturated heterocyclic 6-membered rings where two carbon atoms have been replaced by oxygen atoms, giving the molecular formula C4H4O2
Dibenzo-1,4-dioxin, also known as dibenzodioxin or dibenzo-p-dioxin (molecular formula C12H8O2), in which two benzene rings are connected through two oxygen atoms.  This is the parent compound of the dioxins (see next, where the dioxins comprise a key part of the class)
Dioxins and dioxin-like compounds, a diverse class of chemical compounds which are known to exhibit "dioxin-like" toxicity
2,3,7,8-Tetrachlorodibenzodioxin (TCDD), the prototypical example of the above class, often referred to simply as "dioxin"

See also
1,4-Dioxane, the saturated analog
Agent Orange, of which TCDD is a marginal component
Digoxin
Dioxin affair, a 1999 crisis in Belgium
Seveso disaster, a 1976 crisis in Italy
Times Beach, Missouri, a town contaminated by dioxin waste